Aurora was launched at Kingston upon Hull. She traded with the Baltic until 1803 when she became a Greenland whaler. She was lost in 1821 on her 18th voyage to the northern whale fishery.

Merchantman
Aurora first appeared in Lloyd's Register (LR) in 1782 with Robinson, master, Hall & Co., owners, and trade Hull–Riga, changing to London transport.

Lloyd's List (LL) reported on 20 December 1799, apparently erroneously, that Aurora, Campion, master, had been lost near Cronstadt while sailing from Petersburg to London.

Greenland whaler
LR for 1803 showed Aurora with Campion, master, Hall & Co., owners, changing to Gilder, and trade Hull–Petersburg, changing to Hull–Greenland. She underwent repairs for damages in 1803, and Sadler became her master.

The following whaling data is from Lloyd's List (master and grounds), and Coltish (whale oil):

LL reported in March 1808 that Aurora had had to put back into Hull. She had been bound for Greenland but had gotten on shore. Despite the delay this caused, in 1808 Aurora had the most successful voyage of her career in terms of the amount of whale oil she gathered. It was also the ninth-best haul in the history of the Hull whaling fleet.

LL reported that Aurora, Sadler, master, had had to put into Aberdeen on 20 April 1815 leaky. She had been bound for Greenland and had gotten as far as latitude 63°N before she had had to put back.

Fate
Aurora, of Hull, Thomas, master, was lost on 27 August 1821 at Davis Strait. At the time of her loss she had taken 10 fish.

Citations and references
Citations

References
 
 

1782 ships
Age of Sail merchant ships of England
Whaling ships
Maritime incidents in 1799
Maritime incidents in 1808
Maritime incidents in 1815
Maritime incidents in August 1821
Shipwrecks in the Labrador Sea